The Western constituency (No.212) is a Russian legislative constituency in Saint Petersburg. It covers upscale southwestern Saint Petersburg.

Members elected

Election results

1993

|-
! colspan=2 style="background-color:#E9E9E9;text-align:left;vertical-align:top;" |Candidate
! style="background-color:#E9E9E9;text-align:left;vertical-align:top;" |Party
! style="background-color:#E9E9E9;text-align:right;" |Votes
! style="background-color:#E9E9E9;text-align:right;" |%
|-
|style="background-color:#0085BE"|
|align=left|Vitaly Savitsky
|align=left|Choice of Russia
|
|11.80%
|-
|style="background-color:#EA3C38"|
|align=left|Vladislav Scherbakov
|align=left|Civic Union
| -
|10.09%
|-
| colspan="5" style="background-color:#E9E9E9;"|
|- style="font-weight:bold"
| colspan="3" style="text-align:left;" | Total
| 
| 100%
|-
| colspan="5" style="background-color:#E9E9E9;"|
|- style="font-weight:bold"
| colspan="4" |Source:
|
|}

1995

|-
! colspan=2 style="background-color:#E9E9E9;text-align:left;vertical-align:top;" |Candidate
! style="background-color:#E9E9E9;text-align:left;vertical-align:top;" |Party
! style="background-color:#E9E9E9;text-align:right;" |Votes
! style="background-color:#E9E9E9;text-align:right;" |%
|-
|style="background-color:"|
|align=left|Sergey Nikiforov
|align=left|Yabloko
|
|18.78%
|-
|style="background-color:#F21A29"|
|align=left|Viktor Kharchenko
|align=left|Trade Unions and Industrialists – Union of Labour
|
|13.40%
|-
|style="background-color:"|
|align=left|Yevgeny Krasnitsky
|align=left|Communist Party
|
|11.76%
|-
|style="background-color:"|
|align=left|Valery Filippov
|align=left|Independent
|
|7.92%
|-
|style="background-color:#D50000"|
|align=left|Aleksey Protasov
|align=left|Communists and Working Russia - for the Soviet Union
|
|4.26%
|-
|style="background-color:#A8A821"|
|align=left|Igor Kucherenko
|align=left|Stable Russia
|
|4.05%
|-
|style="background-color:"|
|align=left|Yury Gladkov
|align=left|Independent
|
|3.65%
|-
|style="background-color:#DA2021"|
|align=left|Vyacheslav Shestakov
|align=left|Ivan Rybkin Bloc
|
|3.33%
|-
|style="background-color:#FF4400"|
|align=left|Taisiya Rusinova
|align=left|Party of Workers' Self-Government
|
|2.91%
|-
|style="background-color:"|
|align=left|Sergey Kuznetsov
|align=left|Liberal Democratic Party
|
|2.50%
|-
|style="background-color:#2C299A"|
|align=left|Valery Polosin
|align=left|Congress of Russian Communities
|
|2.28%
|-
|style="background-color:#1C1A0D"|
|align=left|Yevgeny Istomin
|align=left|Forward, Russia!
|
|2.23%
|-
|style="background-color:#F5821F"|
|align=left|Yevgeny Kirichenko
|align=left|Bloc of Independents
|
|1.99%
|-
|style="background-color:#FE4801"|
|align=left|Sergey Kukharev
|align=left|Pamfilova–Gurov–Lysenko
|
|1.95%
|-
|style="background-color:"|
|align=left|Aleksandr Romanov
|align=left|Independent
|
|1.81%
|-
|style="background-color:#2998D5"|
|align=left|Viktor Alekseyev
|align=left|Russian All-People's Movement
|
|1.49%
|-
|style="background-color:"|
|align=left|Aleksandr Kazartsev
|align=left|Independent
|
|0.98%
|-
|style="background-color:#000000"|
|colspan=2 |against all
|
|12.00%
|-
| colspan="5" style="background-color:#E9E9E9;"|
|- style="font-weight:bold"
| colspan="3" style="text-align:left;" | Total
| 
| 100%
|-
| colspan="5" style="background-color:#E9E9E9;"|
|- style="font-weight:bold"
| colspan="4" |Source:
|
|}

1999

|-
! colspan=2 style="background-color:#E9E9E9;text-align:left;vertical-align:top;" |Candidate
! style="background-color:#E9E9E9;text-align:left;vertical-align:top;" |Party
! style="background-color:#E9E9E9;text-align:right;" |Votes
! style="background-color:#E9E9E9;text-align:right;" |%
|-
|style="background-color:#3B9EDF"|
|align=left|Valentina Ivanova
|align=left|Fatherland – All Russia
|
|17.27%
|-
|style="background-color:"|
|align=left|Valery Nemets
|align=left|Communist Party
|
|12.70%
|-
|style="background-color:"|
|align=left|Sergey Nikiforov (incumbent)
|align=left|Yabloko
|
|11.87%
|-
|style="background-color:#1042A5"|
|align=left|Ruslan Linkov
|align=left|Union of Right Forces
|
|11.79%
|-
|style="background-color:"|
|align=left|Aleksandr Vasilyev
|align=left|Independent
|
|9.82%
|-
|style="background-color:#FCCA19"|
|align=left|Boris Gladkikh
|align=left|Congress of Russian Communities-Yury Boldyrev Movement
|
|5.10%
|-
|style="background-color:"|
|align=left|Aleksandra Yakovleva
|align=left|Independent
|
|4.14%
|-
|style="background-color:#C21022"|
|align=left|Aleksandr Rubtsov
|align=left|Party of Pensioners
|
|3.11%
|-
|style="background-color:"|
|align=left|Vladimir Belozerskikh
|align=left|Independent
|
|2.62%
|-
|style="background-color:#7C273A"|
|align=left|Yury Kiselev
|align=left|Movement in Support of the Army
|
|2.26%
|-
|style="background-color:"|
|align=left|Yevgeny Polyakov
|align=left|Liberal Democratic Party
|
|1.83%
|-
|style="background-color:#FF4400"|
|align=left|Galina Silinsh
|align=left|Andrey Nikolayev and Svyatoslav Fyodorov Bloc
|
|1.57%
|-
|style="background-color:"|
|align=left|Vladimir Savitsky
|align=left|Independent
|
|0.99%
|-
|style="background-color:"|
|align=left|Vyacheslav Marychev
|align=left|Independent
|
|0.85%
|-
|style="background-color:"|
|align=left|Vladimir Zhavoronkov
|align=left|Our Home – Russia
|
|0.61%
|-
|style="background-color:#084284"|
|align=left|Grigory Shapovalov
|align=left|Spiritual Heritage
|
|0.31%
|-
|style="background-color:"|
|align=left|Oleg Zharov
|align=left|Independent
|
|0.22%
|-
|style="background-color:#000000"|
|colspan=2 |against all
|
|11.92%
|-
| colspan="5" style="background-color:#E9E9E9;"|
|- style="font-weight:bold"
| colspan="3" style="text-align:left;" | Total
| 
| 100%
|-
| colspan="5" style="background-color:#E9E9E9;"|
|- style="font-weight:bold"
| colspan="4" |Source:
|
|}

2003

|-
! colspan=2 style="background-color:#E9E9E9;text-align:left;vertical-align:top;" |Candidate
! style="background-color:#E9E9E9;text-align:left;vertical-align:top;" |Party
! style="background-color:#E9E9E9;text-align:right;" |Votes
! style="background-color:#E9E9E9;text-align:right;" |%
|-
|style="background-color:"|
|align=left|Valentina Ivanova (incumbent)
|align=left|United Russia
|
|32.05%
|-
|style="background-color:"|
|align=left|Igor Artemyev
|align=left|Yabloko
|
|30.41%
|-
|style="background-color:"|
|align=left|Vladimir Fyodorov
|align=left|Communist Party
|
|9.71%
|-
|style="background-color:#00A1FF"|
|align=left|Dmitry Likhachev
|align=left|Party of Russia's Rebirth-Russian Party of Life
|
|5.26%
|-
|style="background-color:#164C8C"|
|align=left|Lyubov Yegorova
|align=left|United Russian Party Rus'
|
|4.37%
|-
|style="background-color:"|
|align=left|Igor Savelyev
|align=left|Liberal Democratic Party
|
|4.18%
|-
|style="background-color:#14589F"|
|align=left|Igor Onishchenko
|align=left|Development of Enterprise
|
|2.14%
|-
|style="background-color:#000000"|
|colspan=2 |against all
|
|10.82%
|-
| colspan="5" style="background-color:#E9E9E9;"|
|- style="font-weight:bold"
| colspan="3" style="text-align:left;" | Total
| 
| 100%
|-
| colspan="5" style="background-color:#E9E9E9;"|
|- style="font-weight:bold"
| colspan="4" |Source:
|
|}

2016

|-
! colspan=2 style="background-color:#E9E9E9;text-align:left;vertical-align:top;" |Candidate
! style="background-color:#E9E9E9;text-align:leftt;vertical-align:top;" |Party
! style="background-color:#E9E9E9;text-align:right;" |Votes
! style="background-color:#E9E9E9;text-align:right;" |%
|-
| style="background-color: " |
|align=left|Sergey Vostretsov
|align=left|United Russia
|
|25.66%
|-
|style="background-color:"|
|align=left|Dmitry Ushakov
|align=left|A Just Russia
|
|11.94%
|-
|style="background:"| 
|align=left|Olga Galkina
|align=left|Party of Growth
|
|11.77%
|-
|style="background-color:"|
|align=left|Aleksandr Olkhovsky
|align=left|Communist Party
|
|11.02%
|-
|style="background-color:"|
|align=left|Anna Zamarayeva
|align=left|Liberal Democratic Party
|
|10.52%
|-
|style="background:"| 
|align=left|Andrey Palevich
|align=left|Yabloko
|
|7.19%
|-
|style="background-color:"|
|align=left|Aleksandr Baranyuk
|align=left|The Greens
|
|4.68%
|-
|style="background-color:"|
|align=left|Aleksey Gerasimov
|align=left|Rodina
|
|3.37%
|-
|style="background:"| 
|align=left|Kermen Basangova
|align=left|Communists of Russia
|
|3.24%
|-
|style="background:"| 
|align=left|Ilya Lvov
|align=left|People's Freedom Party
|
|2.61%
|-
|style="background-color:"|
|align=left|Vladimir Yedryshev
|align=left|Patriots of Russia
|
|1.51%
|-
|style="background:"| 
|align=left|Vasily Tarsukov
|align=left|Civic Platform
|
|1.13%
|-
| colspan="5" style="background-color:#E9E9E9;"|
|- style="font-weight:bold"
| colspan="3" style="text-align:left;" | Total
| 
| 100%
|-
| colspan="5" style="background-color:#E9E9E9;"|
|- style="font-weight:bold"
| colspan="4" |Source:
|
|}

2021

|-
! colspan=2 style="background-color:#E9E9E9;text-align:left;vertical-align:top;" |Candidate
! style="background-color:#E9E9E9;text-align:left;vertical-align:top;" |Party
! style="background-color:#E9E9E9;text-align:right;" |Votes
! style="background-color:#E9E9E9;text-align:right;" |%
|-
|style="background-color: " |
|align=left|Aleksandr Teterdinko
|align=left|United Russia
|
|22.61%
|-
|style="background-color:"|
|align=left|Nadezhda Tikhonova
|align=left|A Just Russia — For Truth
|
|21.94%
|-
|style="background-color:"|
|align=left|Grigory Menshikov
|align=left|Communist Party
|
|10.59%
|-
|style="background-color:"|
|align=left|Tatyana Bulanova
|align=left|Rodina
|
|7.79%
|-
|style="background-color: "|
|align=left|Pavel Bragin
|align=left|New People
|
|6.98%
|-
|style="background-color:"|
|align=left|Tatyana Ivanova
|align=left|Communists of Russia
|
|5.17%
|-
|style="background-color:"|
|align=left|Pavel Itkin
|align=left|Liberal Democratic Party
|
|4.57%
|-
|style="background-color: "|
|align=left|Roman Guryev
|align=left|Party of Pensioners
|
|4.38%
|-
|style="background-color:"|
|align=left|Andrey Palevich
|align=left|Yabloko
|
|3.10%
|-
|style="background-color: "|
|align=left|Aleksandr Golovanov
|align=left|Party of Growth
|
|2.28%
|-
|style="background-color:"|
|align=left|Galina Savelyeva
|align=left|Russian Party of Freedom and Justice
|
|1.86%
|-
|style="background-color:"|
|align=left|Olesya Utkina
|align=left|The Greens
|
|1.63%
|-
|style="background-color:"|
|align=left|Olga Shestakova
|align=left|Green Alternative
|
|0.98%
|-
|style="background:"| 
|align=left|Svetlana Kalugina
|align=left|Civic Platform
|
|0.66%
|-
| colspan="5" style="background-color:#E9E9E9;"|
|- style="font-weight:bold"
| colspan="3" style="text-align:left;" | Total
| 
| 100%
|-
| colspan="5" style="background-color:#E9E9E9;"|
|- style="font-weight:bold"
| colspan="4" |Source:
|
|}

Notes

References

Russian legislative constituencies
Politics of Saint Petersburg